Courts of Texas include:
;State courts of Texas
Texas Supreme Court (Civil)
Texas Court of Criminal Appeals (Criminal)
Texas Courts of Appeals (14 districts)
Texas District Courts (420 districts)
Texas County Courts
Texas Justice Courts
Texas Municipal Courts

Federal courts located in Texas
United States District Court for the Eastern District of Texas
United States District Court for the Northern District of Texas
United States District Court for the Southern District of Texas
United States District Court for the Western District of Texas

Former federal courts of Texas
United States District Court for the District of Texas (extinct, subdivided)

See also
Judiciary of Texas

References

External links
National Center for State Courts – directory of state court websites.

Courts in the United States